Siege of Perpignan may refer to:

 Siege of Perpignan (1542)
 Siege of Perpignan (1642)